Archierato martinicensis is a species of small sea snail, a marine gastropod mollusk in the family Eratoidae, the false cowries or trivias and allies.

Distribution
This marine species occurs from Florida, U.S.A. to Venezuela.

References

 Schilder F.A. (1933). Monograph of the subfamily Eratoinae. Proceedings of the Malacological Society of London. 20: 244-283.

External links
 Cate C.N. (1977). A review of the Eratoidae (Mollusca: Gastropoda). The Veliger. 19(3): 341–366, 366a, 15 pls
 Fehse D. & Simone L.R.L. (2020). Contributions to the knowledge of the Eratoidae. X. Revision of the genus Archierato Schilder, 1933 (Mollusca: Gastropoda). Zootaxa. 4851(1): 81-110

Eratoidae
Gastropods described in 1933